Tiébélé is a department or commune of Nahouri Province in southeastern Burkina Faso. Its capital lies at the town of Tiébélé; the chief, the royal court and the nobility of the Kassena people, who first settled the region in the 15th century, reside there.

References

Departments of Burkina Faso
Nahouri Province